Jerez Airport , is an airport located  northeast of Jerez de la Frontera in Andalusia, Spain, about  from Cádiz.

Overview
Jerez Airport is a modern airport with the principal arrivals and departures areas on the ground floor. Ryanair introduced regular flights between Jerez Airport and London which helped to increase passenger numbers at the airport to 1.1 million in 2004. Most visitors at the airport arrive from Germany (39%) and the UK (7%), however around 48% of all arriving passengers at Jerez Airport come from domestic flights.
One of the leading flight schools is located at the airport, FTE Jerez, based at the airport's old military barracks.

Airlines and destinations
The following airlines operate regular scheduled and charter flights at Jerez de la Frontera Airport:

Statistics

Ground transportation 
There are regular buses to and from the airport to Jerez, El Puerto de Santa Maria and Cádiz. Taxis and car rental companies are available, too. Jerez Airport train station is situated to the west of the airport, this is the other side of the car parking, at a 1-minute walk. Both medium distance and local trains (Cercanias) operate a regular timetable.

References

External links
Official website 

Airports in Andalusia
Province of Cádiz
Buildings and structures in Jerez de la Frontera
Airports established in 1936